Abubakar Balarabe Mahmoud (popularly known as AB Mahmoud) is a Senior Advocate of Nigeria from Kano State and he was the former president of the Nigerian Bar Association and also Pro-chancellor of Kano University of Science and Technology Wudil.

Early life and education
AB Mahmoud was born in Kano State and started his primary education in Kano, he attended Ahmadu Bello University Zaria  where he obtained Bachelor of Law and Master of Law in 1979 and 1984 respectively where he obtained Bachelor of Laws he when to Nigerian Law School where he was trained as Legal Practitioner and he was called to bar in May 1979.

Career
AB Mahmoud started his career in 1979 as a state council with Kano State Ministry of Justice up-to Attorney General and Commissioner for Justice Kano State he resigned and founded the law firm of Dikko & Mahmoud in 1993, he was elected as Chairman of the Nigerian Bar Association, Kano Branch also in 1993. he became the Senior Advocate of Nigeria in 2001 and he was elected President of the  Nigerian Bar Association where he served between 2016 and 2018 

He is the first Vice President of the Nigerian Stock Exchange He is the council to former Central Bank of Nigeria Governor and the Former Emir of Kano Sanusi Lamido Sanusi

References

1955 births
Living people
Ahmadu Bello University alumni
People from Kano State
20th-century Nigerian lawyers
21st-century Nigerian lawyers
Nigerian Law School alumni